Robert Lee Underwood (December 24, 1934 - March 26, 2011) played baseball for the Birmingham Black Barons of the Negro American League in 1955, staying with the team until 1957.

References

1934 births
2011 deaths
Baseball players from Birmingham, Alabama